The crystal skulls are a number of human skull hardstone carvings made of clear or milky quartz rock,  known in art history as "rock crystal". They are often claimed to be pre-Columbian Mesoamerican artifacts by their alleged finders, however, none of the specimens made available for scientific study have been authenticated as pre-Columbian in origin. Despite some claims presented in an assortment of popularizing literature, legends of crystal skulls with mystical powers do not figure in genuine Mesoamerican or other Native American mythologies and spiritual accounts.

The skulls are often claimed to exhibit paranormal phenomena by some members of the New Age movement, and have often been portrayed as such in fiction. Crystal skulls have been a popular subject appearing in numerous sci-fi television series, novels, and video games.

List of use in popular culture

Museo Nacional de Antropología, Mexico City, where a skull is on display.
For the Love of God, a diamond-encrusted skull made by artist Damien Hirst.
Indiana Jones and the Kingdom of the Crystal Skull, film that revolves around a fictional back-story to the lore of crystal skulls.
The Crystal Skull, a 1996 adventure game that features a crystal skull.
Legend of the Crystal Skull, A Nancy Drew video game which involves searching for a lost crystal skull.
American Dragon: Jake Long, The first half of the second season revolves around finding the 13 Aztec crystal skulls, which hold the power to grant 1 irreversible wish to the person that holds the 13th skull, after the other 12 are placed in the Gargoyles of Pantheon.
Blood Mountain (album), music album with a storyline revolving around a crystal skull.
The Crystal Skull, an episode of The A-Team centered on a crystal skull.
50 Cent: Blood on the Sand is a video game in which rapper 50 Cent fights his way through a desert after someone steals his Crystal Skull.
"Crystal Skull", episode 21 of Season 3 in the TV series Stargate SG-1. The plot involves a crystal skull found on another planet, while the backstory references a crystal skull found that seems to mimic the details of the discovery of the real-life Mitchell-Hedges skull. In the show, the discoverer was Daniel Jackson's grandfather, Nick Ballard, and included a legend that staring into it would allow the person to see aliens from another planet.
 House II: The Second Story where a (supposedly pre-Columbian) crystal skull, with mystical powers is integral to the plot of the movie.
Persona 2: Innocent Sin features a set of crystal skulls.
A single crystal skull appears in La-Mulana and its remake, and a set of crystal skulls are featured more prominently in the sequel.
 In the Peep Show episode 5 of series 5, Jez's manager Cally has a New Age belief in the healing power of crystal skulls, and makes the normally rational Mark agree that "I believe that they were crafted by the ancient inhabitants of Atlantis and that they're powerful centres of healing" in return for keeping peace in the relationship. Mark comically frustratedly smashes the crystal skull later in the episode, stating that if its healing powers is so great it can heal itself.
 Actor Dan Aykroyd co-founded a Vodka called Crystal Head Vodka inspired by the archeological artifacts.
 The Crystal Skull (book), a thriller by Manda Scott
 The Crystal Skulls are mentioned in the Assassin's Creed series as being ancient artifacts (legacy of an ancient, pre-human, mythic society) holding unique powers. In Assassin's Creed: Project Legacy, the Assassin Giovanni Borgia stole one of these skulls from the Aztecs in Mexico and brought it to Bombastus for study, resulting in the discovery of the formula of the Philosopher's stone. In Assassin's Creed, it can be read in one of the emails that the modern-day company Abstergo Industries holds some of these skulls, referring to them as "Mitchell-Hedges Communicators." A crystal skull briefly appears in Assassin's Creed IV: Black Flag as one of the artifacts which drives the plot, which the Templars plan to use to monitor world leaders for incriminating information and then blackmail them.
 Featured as collectable items in Ninja Gaiden II, The Crystal Skulls unlock bonus items as they are gathered throughout the game. They are found all over the world, including Japan and New York, and no reason is presented as to why they are significant items. (Much like the Golden Scarabs featured in the previous title.). 
Veritas: The Quest'''s third episode "Skulls" plot centers around the quest for the fourth of four Crystal Skulls. The skulls were said to be built "molecule by molecule" and when combined would form a sort of weapon.Poptropica: In the Pathfinder tribe's common room, there is a crystal skull.
In the Animated Series Super Robot Monkey Team Hyperforce GO! (SRMTHFG for short) the Antagonist (The Skeleton King)'s Skull was indeed a Crystal Skull, which was used in later-seasons to resurrect him from the dead.
An episode of M.A.S.K. centered on a crystal skull artifact that gave anyone who looked through its eyes X-ray vision, which Miles Mayhem uses to learn the identities of the M.A.S.K. team. Which he conveniently forgets when the skull gets destroyed
A psytrance compilation CD named The Mystery Of The Thirteen Crystal Skulls was released in 2001.The Librarian: Return to King Solomon's Mines begins with the main character stealing a prophetic crystal skull from some treasure-hunters in the U.S. southwest.Zork I features a crystal skull as one of the twenty treasures the player must find in order to win.
The Crystal Skulls are mentioned in the teen-fantasy, The Secret Circle.
In the Nintendo 3DS game The Legend of Zelda: Tri Force Heroes, Crystal Skulls appear as a Material item used to create wearable Outfits. Its in-game description humorously reads, "The secrets this thing must hold! Probably diseases too."
The Crystal Skulls are featured in Raven Software's dark fantasy game Hexen II, where the player character is required to locate a Jade and Crystal skull for a puzzle in the Mesoamerican world of "Mazaera".
 A crystal skull figures prominently in the opening and the ending credits of the three British documentary TV series featuring science-fiction writer Arthur C. Clarke as host, namely Mysterious World (1980), World of Strange Powers (1984) and Mysterious Universe (1995). An episode of Mysterious World devotes an entire show to crystal skulls.
 A crystal skull appears as a collectible item in the 2008 Wii game Wario Land: Shake It! with the description "From a crystal...man?"
 A crystal skull appears in the 1995 Flight of the Amazon Queen adventure game.
 In The Necromancer, the fourth book in The Secrets of the Immortal Nicholas Flamel series, the secondary protagonists - the Flamels - reveal themselves to be in possession of a Crystal Skull, which is one of the last remaining examples of the technology created by Archons, the ancient species that once ruled the world. The Crystal Skull serves as a repository of knowledge, and also allows the users to scry if fed with auric energy. However, the amount of auric energy consumed is enormous, and if used for anything but brief periods, will prematurely age or even kill the user, even if they are biologically immortal.
 In Spriggan anime series, at episode 5, Crystal Skull is an Out Of Place (OOP) Part where it can produce massive energy that can be compared with nuclear bomb.
The 217th book of German editions of the Three Investigators is centered around the Cristal skulls, although there are 7 skulls not the original 4, the Book also tells a Story that resembles the original story of the skulls.
In the Yu-Gi-Oh! 5D's'' anime, the character Tenzen Yanagi uses a card based on crystal skulls that is named as such. Additionally, Trey/III from the Yu-Gi-Oh! ZEXAL anime uses another card based on them in Chronomaly Crystal Skull. Both of these cards have since been printed in the Yu-Gi-Oh! Trading Card Game.

References 

Pseudoarchaeology
Crystal skull
Extraterrestrial life in popular culture
Gemstones in popular culture